Osswald or Oßwald  may refer to:
Albert Osswald (1919–1996), German politician
 Fritz Osswald (1878-1966), Swiss painter
Laura Osswald (born 1982), German actress
Melanie Oßwald (born 1976), German politician
Paul Oßwald (1905–1993), German football player and manager

German-language surnames